James Michael Burke (September 24, 1886 – May 23, 1968) was an Irish-American film and television character actor born in New York City.

Career

Burke made his stage debut in New York around 1912 and went to Hollywood in 1933. He made over 200 film appearances during his career between 1932 and 1964, some of them uncredited. He was often cast as a police officer, usually a none-too-bright one, such as his role as Sergeant Velie in Columbia Pictures' Ellery Queen crime dramas in the early 1940s. Burke can also be seen in At The Circus, The Maltese Falcon, Lone Star, and many other films. One of his memorable roles is his portrayal of a rowdy rancher in the 1935 comedy Ruggles of Red Gap.

In the early 1950s, Burke appeared on television with Tom Conway in the ABC detective drama Inspector Mark Saber—Homicide Detective, a series later renamed, reformatted, and switched to NBC under the new title Saber of London. In 1955 Burke appeared as Buckshot on the TV western Cheyenne in the episode "Border Showdown." In 1958, he appeared as Sheriff John Tatum in the episode, "Bounty" in the TV series, Wanted: Dead or Alive.

Death
Burke died on May 23, 1968 in Los Angeles, California at age 81. His death was attributed to a heart condition.

Selected filmography

The Painted Woman (1932) - Sailor, Yank's Pal (uncredited)
Face in the Sky (1933) - Cop (uncredited)
A Lady's Profession (1933) - Mulroy
The Girl in 419 (1933) - Detective Jackson
The Man Who Dared (1933) - Registrar of Voters (uncredited)
College Humor (1933) - Cromwell Dexter
Her Bodyguard (1933) - Police Captain (uncredited)
The Power and the Glory (1933) - Gateman (uncredited)
Torch Singer (1933) - Taxicab Driver (uncredited)
To the Last Man (1933) - Kentucky Sheriff (uncredited)
The Bowery (1933) - Recruiting Sergeant (uncredited)
Bombshell (1933) - First Immigration Officer (uncredited)
Tillie and Gus (1933) - Juror (uncredited)
The Kennel Murder Case (1933) - Policeman Who Lets Philo's Dog Out (uncredited)
Blood Money (1933) - Pool Hall Detective (uncredited)
Jimmy and Sally (1933) - Furniture Mover (uncredited)
Gallant Lady (1933) - Policeman in Park (uncredited)
Lady Killer (1933) - Panhandler (uncredited)
Queen Christina (1933) - the Blacksmith - 4th Rabble Rouser (uncredited)
It's a Gift (1934)
Fugitive Lovers (1934) - Joe Cobb (uncredited)
All of Me (1934) - Welfare Island Guard (uncredited)
Six of a Kind (1934) - Detective (uncredited)
It Happened One Night (1934) - Detective (uncredited)
Gambling Lady (1934) - Detective Making Raid (uncredited)
Wharf Angel (1934) - Brooklyn Jack
Good Dame (1934) - Cop (uncredited)
City Limits (1934) - King
Sisters Under the Skin (1934) - Conroy
A Very Honorable Guy (1934) - Sergeant (uncredited)
Twentieth Century (1934) - Sheriff (uncredited)
Sadie McKee (1934) - First Motorcycle Cop (uncredited)
The Scarlet Empress (1934) - Guard (uncredited)
The Merry Frinks (1934) - 3rd Expressman (uncredited)
Little Miss Marker (1934) - Detective Reardon (uncredited)
Such Women Are Dangerous (1934) - Detective
Friends of Mr. Sweeney (1934) - Policeman Arresting Wynn (uncredited)
The Cat's-Paw (1934) - Gargan (uncredited)
The Girl from Missouri (1934) - Policeman at Cousins' Suicide (uncredited)
Treasure Island (1934) - Pirate of the Spanish Main
The Lemon Drop Kid (1934) - First Tramp (uncredited)
Happiness Ahead (1934) - Policeman (uncredited)
Lady by Choice (1934) - Brannigan
Love Time (1934) - Emperor Francis I
Ticket to a Crime (1934) - Detective Lt. John Aloysius McGinnis
The Secret Bride (1934) - Diner Counterman (uncredited)
Rumba (1935) - Reporter (uncredited)
The Mystery Man (1935) - Managing Editor Marvin
Ruggles of Red Gap (1935) - Jeff Tuttle
Mississippi (1935) - Skeptical Passenger in Pilot House (uncredited)
Princess O'Hara (1935) - A Detective (uncredited)
Dinky (1935) - Truck Driver
So Red the Rose (1935) - Major Rushton
Make a Million (1935) - Pete
After the Dance (1935) - Police Lieutenant (uncredited)
Broadway Gondolier (1935) - Uncle Andy
The Farmer Takes a Wife (1935) - Man Hauling Rifles and Bullets (uncredited)
Man on the Flying Trapeze (1935) - Patrolman No.2
Welcome Home (1935) - Michael Shaughnessy
Call of the Wild (1935) - Ole
The Affair of Susan (1935) - Hogan
Here Comes Cookie (1935) - Broken-Nose Reilly
Case of the Missing Man (1935) - Police Sergeant Rorty
Remember Last Night? (1935) - Motorcycle Cop (uncredited)
Music Is Magic (1935) - Mickey (uncredited)
Coronado (1935) - Slug Moran
Frisco Waterfront (1935) - Corrigan
Dancing Feet (1936) - Phil Moore
It Had to Happen (1936) - Foreman (uncredited)
The Leathernecks Have Landed (1936) - Corrigan
The Trail of the Lonesome Pine (1936) - Leader (uncredited)
Klondike Annie (1936) - Bartender (uncredited)
Song and Dance Man (1936) - Lt. Mike Boyle
Forgotten Faces (1936) - Sgt. Johnny Donovan
Rhythm on the Range (1936) - Wabash
36 Hours to Kill (1936) - Doyle
Pepper (1936) - Hamburger Man (uncredited)
Old Hutch (1936) - Bank Teller (scenes deleted)
Can This Be Dixie? (1936) - Sheriff N.B.F. Rider
Laughing at Trouble (1936) - Sheriff Bill Norton
Great Guy (1936) - Pat Haley
Champagne Waltz (1937) - Mr. Scribner
Pick a Star (1937) - Detective Nolan (uncredited)
High, Wide and Handsome (1937) - Stackpole
Dead End (1937) - Officer Mulligan
Life Begins with Love (1937) - Darby McGraw
The Perfect Specimen (1937) - Sheriff Bill Snodgrass
The Buccaneer (1938) - Pirate (uncredited)
Flight into Nowhere (1938) - Ike Matthews
Joy of Living (1938) - Mac
Men with Wings (1938) - J.A. Nolan
You Can't Take It with You (1938) - Chief Detective (uncredited)
The Affairs of Annabel (1938) - Muldoon
The Mad Miss Manton (1938) - Sullivan
Little Orphan Annie (1938) - Mike Moriarty
Orphans of the Street (1938) - Police Officer Lou Manning
The Dawn Patrol (1938) - Flaherty
The Saint Strikes Back (1939) - Headquarters Police Officer
Within the Law (1939) - 'Red'
I'm from Missouri (1939) - Walt Bliss
The Family Next Door (1939) - Policeman (uncredited)
Sudden Money (1939) - McPherson
Dodge City (1939) - Cattle Auctioneer (uncredited)
On Borrowed Time (1939) - Sheriff Burlingame
Beau Geste (1939) - Lieutenant Dufour
Fast and Furious (1939) - Clancy
At the Circus (1939) - John Carter
The Cisco Kid and the Lady (1939) - Pop Saunders
Double Alibi (1940) - Police Captain Orr
Buck Benny Rides Again (1940) - Taxi Driver
Charlie Chan's Murder Cruise (1940) - Wilkie
Opened by Mistake (1940) - Police Sergeant Wilkins
The Saint Takes Over (1940) - Patrolman Mike
The Way of All Flesh (1940) - Frisco
The Golden Fleecing (1940) - Sibley - Motorcycle Cop
No Time for Comedy (1940) - Police Sergeant (uncredited)
Little Nellie Kelly (1940) - Sergeant McGowan
Ellery Queen, Master Detective (1940) - Sgt. Velle
Ellery Queen's Penthouse Mystery (1941) - Police Sergeant Velie
Pot o' Gold (1941) - Lt. Grady
Reaching for the Sun (1941) - Norm
Million Dollar Baby (1941) - Callahan
Ellery Queen and the Perfect Crime (1941) - Sgt. Velie
The Maltese Falcon (1941) - Luke
Ellery Queen and the Murder Ring (1941) - Sgt. Velie
All Through the Night (1942) - Lieutenant Forbes
A Close Call for Ellery Queen (1942) - Police Sgt. Velle
My Favorite Blonde (1942) - Union Secretary
A Desperate Chance for Ellery Queen (1942) - Sgt. Velie
It Happened in Flatbush (1942) - Umpire Shaunnessy
Are Husbands Necessary? (1942) - Tough Mugg (uncredited)
Enemy Agents Meet Ellery Queen (1942) - Police Sgt. Velie
Army Surgeon (1942) - Brooklyn
A Night to Remember (1942) - Pat Murphy
No Place for a Lady (1943) - Moriarity
Dixie (1943) - Riverboat Captain (uncredited)
Thank Your Lucky Stars (1943) - Bill - the Intern Guard (uncredited)
Riding High (1943) - Pete Brown (uncredited)
3 Men in White (1944) - First Policeman (uncredited)
Casanova Brown (1944) - O'Leary (uncredited)
The Horn Blows at Midnight (1945) - Cliffside Park Policeman (uncredited)
Anchors Aweigh (1945) - Studio Cop
Guest Wife (1945) - Waiter (uncredited)
Shady Lady (1945) - Crane
I Love a Bandleader (1945) - Charles Gibley
How DOooo You Do (1945) - Detective
Young Widow (1946) - Motorcycle Cop (uncredited)
The Virginian (1946) - Andy Jones (uncredited)
Bowery Bombshell (1946) - Detective O'Malley
Two Years Before the Mast (1946) - Carrick
Sister Kenny (1946) - Minor Role (scenes deleted)
California (1947) - Pokey
Easy Come, Easy Go (1947) - Harry Weston
Lost Honeymoon (1947) - Bartender (uncredited)
 Philo Vance's Gamble (1947) - Lt. Burke
Blaze of Noon (1947) - Farmer (uncredited)
Living in a Big Way (1947) - Murphy (uncredited)
Down to Earth (1947) - Detective Kelly
Gas House Kids in Hollywood (1947) - Police Lt. Burke
Song of the Thin Man (1947) - Michael Callahan - Police Officer (uncredited)
Nightmare Alley (1947) - Rural Marshal (uncredited)
Body and Soul (1947) - Arnold (uncredited)
The Big Clock (1948) - O'Brien
The Timber Trail (1948) - Jed Baker
Texas, Brooklyn and Heaven (1948) - Cop (uncredited)
Beyond Glory (1948) - Jim, the Bartender (uncredited)
Night Wind (1948) - Sheriff Hamilton
June Bride (1948) - Luke Potter
 Shamrock Hill  (1949)  - Michael Rogan
Alias Nick Beal (1949) - Bum (uncredited)
Take Me Out to the Ball Game (1949) - Policeman (uncredited)
Mighty Joe Young (1949) - Producer (uncredited)
Red, Hot and Blue (1949) - Joe, Doorman (uncredited)
The Kid from Texas (1950) - Blacksmith (uncredited)
Let's Dance (1950) - George (uncredited)
Copper Canyon (1950) - Jeb Bassett
Mrs. O'Malley and Mr. Malone (1950) - The Train Conductor
Valentino (1951) - Policeman in Park (uncredited)
The Last Outpost (1951) - Stagecoach Driver (uncredited)
Raton Pass (1951) - Hank
Excuse My Dust (1951) - MSgt. Nuckols (uncredited)
His Kind of Woman (1951) - Barkeeper in Nogales (uncredited)
Warpath (1951) - Oldtimer
Here Comes the Groom (1951) - O'Neill, Policeman
Lone Star (1952) - Luther Kilgore
Denver and Rio Grande (1952) - Sheriff Ed Johnson
We're Not Married! (1952) - Willie's Sergeant (uncredited)
Toughest Man in Arizona (1952) - George Ryan (uncredited)
Lucky Me (1954) - Mahoney
You're Never Too Young (1955) - Pullman Conductor (uncredited)
The Birds and the Bees (1956) - Steward (uncredited)
Back from Eternity (1956) - Grimsby, Airline Manager (uncredited)
Public Pigeon No. 1 (1957) - Harrigan
The Unholy Wife (1957) - Sheriff Tom Watling
Alias Jesse James (1959) - Charlie (uncredited)
The Young Philadelphians (1959) - Police Officer Barney Flanagan (uncredited)

• Stagecoach West - TV (1960/61) - Zeke Bonner (recurring character)

References and notes

External links

Male actors from New York City
American male stage actors
American male film actors
American male television actors
20th-century American male actors
1886 births
1968 deaths